Barzak may refer to:
Christopher Barzak (b. 1975), American author
Barzok, a city in Iran